François-Xavier Brunet (November 27, 1868 – January 7, 1922) was a Canadian Roman Catholic priest and bishop of Mont-Laurier, Quebec.

Biography
Baptized in the parish of Saint-André-d'Argenteuil, Quebec, he moved to Ottawa in 1873. He received a Bachelor of Arts degree in 1890 from the College of Ottawa. He then decided to become a priest and studied theology at the Grand Séminaire d'Ottawa.

Brunet was consecrated by Archbishop Joseph-Thomas Duhamel of Ottawa in 1893. In 1913, he was appointed the first bishop of the new diocese of Mont-Laurier, which was created from parts of the Archdiocese of Montréal and the Archdiocese of Ottawa.

He died in Montreal in 1922.

References

 

1868 births
1922 deaths
20th-century Roman Catholic bishops in Canada
Roman Catholic bishops of Mont-Laurier